was a Japanese national born in Aomori Prefecture. Shiratori is famous for having escaped from prison four different times, making him an anti-hero in Japanese culture. There is a memorial to Shiratori at the Abashiri Prison Museum.

There are numerous tales describing his escapes, but some details may be folkloric rather than factual.

Prison breaks
Shiratori was born on 31 July 1907, in Aomori, Japan. Initially, he worked in a tofu shop and later as a fisherman to catch crabs in Russia. After switching jobs several times and finding little success, he turned to gambling for a living.

Aomori prison break
Falsely accused of robbery and murder, Shiratori was imprisoned at Aomori prison in 1936. However, after studying the guards' routine for months, he escaped by picking his cell lock with the metal wire that was wrapped around the bucket provided for bathing and escaped through a cracked skylight. Before escaping, he placed floorboards onto his futon to fool the passing guards into thinking he was still asleep.

Akita prison break
Police recaptured Shiratori after three days while he was stealing supplies from a hospital. Sentenced to life in prison for escaping and theft, he was transferred to Akita prison in 1942.

At Akita prison, Shiratori was placed in a cell specially designed for escape artists, featuring high ceilings, one small skylight, and smooth copper walls. Nevertheless, Shiratori was able to scale the walls, and noticed that the wood holding the window bars was beginning to rot. Every night, he would climb up to loosen the vent, until he finally managed to pry away the wood and open the skylight. Knowing prison staff would be able to hear his footsteps on the roof, Shiratori waited until a stormy night to climb the walls and escape. Three months later, he showed up at Guard Kobayashi’s house to ask for help in a case against injustice in the Japanese prison system, as he was one of the only people who had shown kindness and respect to Shiratori during his stay in the Akita prison. However, while Shiratori was in the bathroom, the guard called the police, and Shiratori was arrested and sent back to prison.

Abashiri prison break

During the winter of 1943, Shiratori was transferred to Abashiri prison in Northern Hokkaido, the country’s northernmost prison. Still wearing summer prison garments, he was thrown into an open cell exposed to the extreme cold, allowing the guards to beat him down whenever he stood up. Angrily, Shiratori vowed to escape, and to the guards' amazement, broke his handcuffs in front of them. Later, he was placed in specially made handcuffs taking nearly two hours to unlock by a specialist who came once per week so that he could bathe. When the guards delivered meals however, he would always drip miso soup on the handcuffs and food slot, both of which eventually became corroded, allowing Shiratori to break them. Then on 26 August 1944, he dislocated both of his shoulders, enabling him to fit out of the narrow food slot in his cell door and escaped the prison, using a wartime blackout as cover. 
After living in an abandoned mine deep in the mountains for two years, he descended to a nearby village, and learned of the surrender of Japan. However, he was captured yet again after fatally stabbing a farmer who attacked him after he was caught stealing a tomato from his farm. He said it was an act of self defense. By now, he had made headlines on several newspapers.

Sapporo prison break
For his previous escapes and the farmer's murder, Shiratori was sentenced to death by the Sapporo District Court. At the Sapporo prison, he was placed in a specially designed cell with high ceilings and windows smaller than his head. However, the prison guards at Sapporo had so much faith in it that they no longer bothered to handcuff Shiratori, and because they paid so much attention towards his ceiling escapes, they neglected the floors.
In 1947, he dug his way out by making a tunnel with miso soup bowls, placing the dirt in a small pocket underneath the floorboards.

Final years
After a year of freedom, it is said that Shiratori was offered a cigarette by a police officer in a park. Moved by the kindness (in 1948, cigarettes were luxury items in Japan), Shiratori admitted he was an escaped convict and offered to be turned in. He was arrested and tried once again, but the High Court of Sapporo, having reviewed his case, decided that the farmer's death was a result of acting in self defense, and during his escapes, he had not once injured or killed a single guard. As a result, the court revoked his death sentence, instead sentencing him to 20 years for his escapes. Shiratori's request to be imprisoned in Tokyo was also granted, and he spent 14 years in Fuchu Prison until 1961, when he was released for good behavior.

Later, he returned to Aomori to reunite with his daughter; his wife had died while he was in prison. Shiratori lived for another decade working odd jobs to survive. He eventually succumbed to a heart attack in 1979, at the age of 71.

In media 
Akira Yoshimura's novel Hagoku is based on Shiratori's life.

The character Yoshitake Shiraishi in the manga Golden Kamuy by Satoru Noda was revealed in an interview with the author to have been based on and named after Shiratori.

References

External links
Hagoku from Charm of Hokkaido
 Yoshie Shiratori from MONSTERS

1907 births
1979 deaths
Escapees from Japanese detention
Fugitives
Japanese escapees
Japanese people convicted of murder
Japanese prisoners sentenced to death
Japanese prisoners sentenced to life imprisonment
People convicted of murder by Japan
People from Aomori Prefecture
People paroled from death sentence
People paroled from life sentence
Prisoners sentenced to death by Japan
Prisoners sentenced to life imprisonment by Japan